The 2004 Vanderbilt Commodores football team represented the Vanderbilt University in the 2004 NCAA Division I-A football season.  The Commodores offense scored 212 points while the defense allowed 268 points. Led by head coach Bobby Johnson in his third year as the head coach, the Commodores finished with a 2–9 record.

Schedule

Personnel

Season summary

Tennessee

Team players drafted into the NFL

References

Vanderbilt
Vanderbilt Commodores football seasons
Vanderbilt Commodores football